Flasch is a German language surname.

List of people with the surname 
 Colton Flasch (born 1991), Canadian curler
 Gene Flasch, Canadian politician
 Kilian Caspar Flasch (1831–1891), German-born prelate of the Roman Catholic Church
 Kurt Flasch (born 1930), German philosopher

See also 
 Fläsch

Surnames
German-language surnames
Surnames of German origin